Gmina Dąbie may refer to either of the following gminas (municipalities) in Poland:

Gmina Dąbie, Greater Poland Voivodeship, an urban-rural gmina in Koło County, Greater Poland Voivodeship
Gmina Dąbie, Lubusz Voivodeship, a rural gmina in Krosno Odrzańskie County, Lubusz Voivodeship